Shipot Point (‘Nos Shipot’ \'nos 'shi-pot\) is the ice-free point on the northwest coast of Robert Island in the South Shetland Islands projecting 630 m northwards, and together with Osenovlag Island and Svetulka Island forming the southwest side of Clothier Harbour.  The area was visited by early 19th century sealers.

The point is named after the settlement of Shipot in Northwestern Bulgaria.

Location
Bulgarian mapping in 2009.

Maps
 Livingston Island to King George Island.  Scale 1:200000.  Admiralty Nautical Chart 1776.  Taunton: UK Hydrographic Office, 1968.
 L.L. Ivanov. Antarctica: Livingston Island and Greenwich, Robert, Snow and Smith Islands. Scale 1:120000 topographic map. Troyan: Manfred Wörner Foundation, 2009.  (Second edition 2010)
 Antarctic Digital Database (ADD). Scale 1:250000 topographic map of Antarctica. Scientific Committee on Antarctic Research (SCAR), 1993–2016.

References
 Shipot Point. SCAR Composite Antarctic Gazetteer.
 Bulgarian Antarctic Gazetteer. Antarctic Place-names Commission. (details in Bulgarian, basic data in English)

External links
 Shipot Point. Copernix satellite image

Headlands of Robert Island
Bulgaria and the Antarctic